The African Training Institute was a religious Christian institution set up to educate children in Africa. It was established in Colwyn, Wales by the Reverend William Hughes under the name Congo Training Institute (or Congo House) in 1889 to educate children of the Congo. Leopold II, the king of Belgium, was the sponsor of the institution. The institute also attracted pupils from Cameroon, Nigeria, Sierra Leone, Liberia, and the United States. The pupils also received training in handicrafts. In 1912 William Hughes faced bankruptcy after he lost a libel case, and as a result the institution closed.

References

Further reading 
 Draper, Christopher a Lawson-Reay, John. Scandal at Congo House: William Hughes and the African Institute, Colwyn Bay (Llanrwst, Gwasg Carreg Gwalch, 2012).

Colwyn Bay
History of Christianity in Wales
1889 establishments in the United Kingdom
Educational institutions established in 1889
Religious organisations based in Wales